CWB may stand for:

Businesses and organisations
 Canadian Western Bank
 Canadian Wheat Board
 Canadian Welding Bureau
 Center for Wooden Boats, a non-profit organization
 Central Weather Bureau of Taiwan

Music
 Chocolate Watchband, a psychedelic 60s band
 Conductors Without Borders, an international musical-training effort

Places

Hong Kong
 Causeway Bay
 Central–Wan Chai Bypass
 Clear Water Bay

Elsewhere
 Afonso Pena International Airport, Brazil (by IATA code)
 Colwyn Bay railway station, north Wales (by GBR code)

Science
 Certified Wildlife Biologist, a professional certification offered by The Wildlife Society
 Counterproductive work behavior
 Cwb is one of four symbols for the Oceanic climate under the Köppen climate classification system, although generally limited to highland areas in the tropics